The following are the football (soccer) events of the year 1933 throughout the world.

Events

Winners club national championship 
 Argentina: San Lorenzo
 England: Arsenal F.C.
 France: FC Sète
 Germany: Fortuna Düsseldorf
 Hungary: Újpest FC
 Italy: Juventus F.C.
 Poland: Ruch Chorzów
 Scotland:
Division One: Rangers F.C.
Scottish Cup: Celtic F.C.
 Romania: Ripensia Timișoara
 Spain: Real Madrid
 Turkey: Fenerbahçe

International tournaments
 1933 British Home Championship (17 September 1932 – 1 April 1933)

Births
 April 5: Feridun Buğeker, Turkish international footballer (died 2014)
 May 5: Hans van der Hoek, Dutch international footballer (died 2017)
 May 15: Peter Broadbent, English international footballer (died 2013)
 July 1: 
 Radivoje Ognjanović, Serbian football player and manager (died 2011)
 Hamza Qasim, Iraqi football goalkeeper
 July 6: Frank Austin, English footballer (died 2004)
 July 9: John Devine, English footballer (died 2017)
 July 13: Ceninho (Avâtenio Antônio da Costa), former Brazilian footballer
 August 6: Ulrich Biesinger German international footballer (died 2011)
 August 18: Just Fontaine, French international footballer
 September 11: Amby Fogarty, Irish international footballer (died 2016)
 September 12: Len Allchurch, Welsh international footballer (died 2016)
 September 22: Carmelo Simeone, Argentine international footballer (died 2014)
 October 7: Henryk Szczepański, Polish international footballer (died 2015)
 October 10: Giuliano Sarti, Italian international footballer (died 2017)
 October 26: Raúl Sánchez, Chilean international footballer (died 2016)
 November 19: Nicolae Rainea, Romanian football referee (died 2015)

References

 
Association football by year